Last Call is a 2021 comedy-drama film directed by Paolo Pilladi, written by Paolo Pilladi and Greg Lingo and based on a story by Greg Lingo, Michael Baughan and Billy Reilly. It was originally under the working title Crabs in a Bucket, The film stars Jeremy Piven , Taryn Manning, Zach McGowan, Jamie Kennedy and Bruce Dern.

Last Call was released theatrically in the United States on March 19, 2021 by IFC Films as well as made available streaming OnDemand, YouTube, iTunes, Apple TV, Google Play, Vudu, Amazon Video, Xbox, DirecTV, and IFC Center. It was released in the United Kingdom on March 29, 2021.

Plot
Mick (Jeremy Piven) is a local success story and Philadelphia real estate developer. He returns home to his blue-collar neighborhood, fictional "Darby Heights (based on Upper Darby, a suburb of West Philadelphia), for a funeral and is obligated to stay to ensure his parents’ ailing family business gets back on course.

In the meantime, he begins to grow closer to his childhood crush, Ali (Taryn Manning) whilst enduring constant ridicule from his old hometown crew. As Mick begins to reconnect with the neighborhood, he finds himself at a crossroads when forced to either raze or resurrect the family bar.

Cast
 Jeremy Piven as Seamus 'Mick' McDougal
 Taryn Manning as Ali
 Zach McGowan as Laurence 'Dougal' McDougal Jr.
 Jack McGee as Laurence
 Cathy Moriarty as Mrs C.
 Cheri Oteri as Dr. Baba Brown
 Jamie Kennedy as 'Whitey'
 Bruce Dern as Coach
 Peter Patrikios as 'Digits'
 Jason James Richter as Saville
 Betsy Beutler as Carla 
 Gary Pastore as Mr. Delvecchio
 Joseph Gannascoli as Charlie
 Robert Clohessy as Aidan
 Rob Hneleski as Big Guy
 Chris Kerson as Paddy
 Leticia Castillo as Melanie
 Paul Scheb as Shirt Stain (aka Grimace)
 Lauren Francesca as Morgan

Production
Filming took place in September 2019 in Bayonne, New Jersey. There was additional filming that also took place in Upper Darby, Pennsylvania.

Reception
The film has an average rating of 2.7/10 on Rotten Tomatoes, based on seven critic reviews.

References

External links
 
 
 

Films set in Philadelphia
Films shot in New Jersey
2021 films
2021 independent films
2021 comedy-drama films
American comedy-drama films
IFC Films films
2020s English-language films
2020s American films